Paul Kelly is an Australian rock/folk musician, singer-songwriter who started his professional career in 1974 and released his first recording in 1979. Kelly, in various guises, has released eighteen studio albums, Talk (1981), Manila (1982), Post (1985), Gossip (1986), Under The Sun (1987), So Much Water So Close To Home (1989), Comedy (1991), Hidden Things (1992), Wanted Man (1994), Deeper Water (1995), Words and Music (1998), Smoke (1999), Professor Ratbaggy (1999), Nothing But A Dream (2001), Ways & Means (2004), Foggy Highway (2005), Stardust Five (2006), and Stolen Apples (2007).

Kelly has won and been nominated for numerous music awards. They include nine Australian Recording Industry Association (ARIA) Awards and three Australasian Performing Right Association (APRA) Awards/Australian Guild of Screen Composers (AGSC) Awards. APRA also named "To Her Door", solely written by Kelly, and "Treaty", written by Kelly and members of Indigenous Australian band Yothu Yindi, in the Top 30 best Australian songs of all time in 2001. Kelly was inducted into the ARIA Hall of Fame in 1997 alongside the Bee Gees and Graeme Bell. This induction recognised his achievement of a "significant body of recorded work" and that he "has had a cultural impact within Australia". Kelly has also won awards in the country music field with six from the Country Music Association of Australia (CMAA) and three more from the Victorian Country Music Awards. As a live performer, Kelly won four Australian entertainment industry awards or Mo Awards.

In 2019, at the Screen Music Awards, Paul Kelly won Best Original Song Composed for the Screen for "Every Day My Mother's Voice" with Dan Sultan.

History
Paul Kelly has performed in many guises including: as a solo act; as the leader of various bands – the Paul Kelly Band, Paul Kelly and the Dots, Paul Kelly and the Coloured Girls, Paul Kelly and the Messengers, Paul Kelly and the Boon Companions, and Paul Kelly and the Stormwater Boys; and as a member of the related projects Professor Ratbaggy and Stardust Five. He has also performed or composed award-winning or nominated songs with other artists including Christine Anu, Uncle Bill, Kev Carmody and Archie Roach. The category for which he has received most nominations is Best Male Artist, or its equivalent as Male Vocalist of the Year (Country Music) or Male Rock Performer, with a total of 14 nominations resulting in four wins.

Australian of the Year Awards
The Australian of the Year Awards were established in 1960, in celebration Australia Day (26 January), to give proper recognition to a leading citizen, whose contribution to the nation's culture, economy, sciences or arts was particularly outstanding. The recipient is determined by the National Australia Day Council from the State winners. Kelly was a Victorian State Finalist for the 2012 Australian of the Year Award.

|-
| 2012 || Paul Kelly || Australian of the Year (Victorian winner) || 
|-

Australian Record Industry Association (ARIA) Awards

These awards have been presented by the ARIA since 1987. Paul Kelly has won 17 ARIA Awards from at least 61 nominations, including his first win in 1988 for the 'Best Video' award for "To Her Door", which was written by Kelly and performed by Paul Kelly and the Coloured Girls. His success has been across categories, being successful five times in 'Best Adult Contemporary Album', three times in the 'Best Male Artist' and three times in the 'Best Original Soundtrack' categories. Kelly has been nominated for 'Best Male Artist' eighteen times including a run of eight years in a row 1995 to 2002 winning in 1997, 1998 and 2017. Kelly was also inducted into the ARIA Hall of Fame in 1997 alongside Bee Gees and Graeme Bell. In 2019 he became the first artist to be nominated in three genre categories for three different releases – he won two of those awards. Further genre-hopping occurred in 2020 with a win for Best Jazz Album.

|-
|rowspan="5"| 1987 || rowspan="2"| Gossip || Best Male Artist ||  
|-
| Album of the Year ||  
|-
|rowspan="2"| "Before Too Long" || Single of the Year ||  
|-
| Song of the Year || 
|-
| Gossip – Alan Thorne || Producer of the Year ||  
|-
|| 1988 ||| "To Her Door" || Best Video ||  
|-
| 1989 ||| "Forty Miles to Saturday Night" || Best Male Artist ||  
|-
|rowspan="4"| 1990 || rowspan="3"| So Much Water So Close To Home || Album of the Year ||  
|-
| Best Male Artist ||  
|-
| Best Adult Contemporary Album ||   
|-
|| "Careless" || Song of the Year ||  
|-
| 1993 ||| "Paul Kelly Live" || Best Male Artist ||  
|-
| rowspan="2"| 1994 || "Last Train" || Best Video ||  
|-
| "Last Train" – Angelique Cooper || Producer of the Year ||  
|-
| 1995 ||| Wanted Man || Best Male Artist ||  
|-
| 1996 ||| Deeper Water || Best Male Artist ||  
|-
|rowspan="5"| 1997 ||| How to Make Gravy || Best Male Artist ||  
|-
| Songs from the South || Best Cover Art ||  
|-
| "Tease Me – Tease Me" || Engineer of the Year||  
|-
| "How to Make Gravy" || Song of the Year ||  
|-
| Paul Kelly || ARIA Hall of Fame ||  
|-
| 1998 ||| Words and Music || Best Male Artist ||  
|-
| 1999 ||| "I'll Be Your Lover" || Best Male Artist ||  
|-
| 2000 ||| Smoke || Best Male Artist ||  
|-
| 2001 ||| Roll on Summer || Best Male Artist ||  
|-
|rowspan="4"| 2002 ||| Nothing but a Dream || Best Male Artist ||  
|-
| Lantana || Best Original Soundtrack Album ||  
|-
| Sensual Being || Producer of the Year ||  
|-
| Nothing but a Dream || Best Adult Contemporary Album ||  
|-
| 2004 || Ways & Means || Best Adult Contemporary Album ||  
|-
|rowspan="2"| 2005 ||rowspan="2"| Foggy Highway || Best Male Artist ||  
|-
| Best Country Album ||  
|-
| 2006 || Jindabyne || Best Original Soundtrack / Cast / Show Album ||  
|-
|rowspan="2"| 2007 ||rowspan="2"| Stolen Apples || Best Male Artist ||   
|-
| Best Adult Contemporary Album||  
|-
|rowspan="2"| 2008 ||"To Her Door (Live)" || Best Male Artist ||  
|-
| Live Apples || Best Music DVD || 
|-
|rowspan="3"| 2013 ||| Spring and Fall || Best Male Artist ||  
|-
| Conversations with Ghosts || Best Original Soundtrack / Cast / Show Album ||  
|-
| Paul Kelly and Neil Finn – Australian Tour: February – March 2013 || Best Australian Live Act ||  
|-
| 2014 ||| Paul Kelly and Neil Finn – Goin' Your Way || Best Adult Contemporary Album ||  
|-
|rowspan="3"| 2015 || rowspan="2"| The Merri Soul Sessions || Best Independent Release ||  
|-
| Best Adult Contemporary Album ||  
|-
| The Merri Soul Sessions Tour || Best Australian Live Act ||  
|-
| 2016 || Seven Sonnets & a Song || Best Adult Contemporary Album ||  
|-
|rowspan="7"| 2017 || rowspan="3"| Life Is Fine || Album of the Year || 
|-
| Best Male Artist ||  
|-
| Best Adult Contemporary Album ||  
|-
| Death's Dateless Night – Paul Kelly and Charlie Owen || Best Blues & Roots Album ||  
|-
| Life Is Fine – Steven Schram & Paul Kelly || Producer of the Year ||  
|-
| Life Is Fine – Steven Schram || Engineer of the Year ||  
|-
| Life Is Fine – Peter Salmon-Lomas || Best Cover Art ||  
|-
| 2018 || Life Is Fine Tour 2017 || Best Australian Live Act ||  
|-
|rowspan="6"| 2019 || Thirteen Ways to Look at Birds – Paul Kelly and James Ledger || Best Classical Album ||  
|-
| Nature – Paul Kelly and Steven Schram || Producer of the Year ||  
|-
| Nature – Lucy Dyson || Best Cover Art || 
|-
| rowspan="2"| Nature || Best Male Artist ||  
|-
| Best Adult Contemporary Album ||  
|-
| Live at Sydney Opera House || Best Blues & Roots Album ||  
|-
|rowspan="2"| 2020 || Please Leave Your Light On – Paul Kelly and Paul Grabowsky || Best Jazz Album ||  
|-
| Paul Kelly – Making Gravy 2019 || Best Australian Live Act ||  
|-

Australasian Performing Right Association (APRA) Awards

These awards were established by APRA in 1982 to honour the achievements of songwriters and music composers, and to recognise their songwriting skills, sales and airplay performance, by its members annually. Paul Kelly has won two APRA Awards out of four nominations. The songs "To Her Door" and "Treaty", written or co-written by Kelly, were also voted in the Top 30 Best Australian songs of all time in 2001 by a panel of 100 music industry personalities.

At the 2011 APRA Music Awards Kelly was honoured with the Ted Albert Award for Outstanding Services to Australian Music.

|-
|| 1991 || "Treaty" || Song of the Year || 
|-
| 1998 || "How to Make Gravy" || Song of the Year || 
|-
| 1999 || Paul Kelly || Songwriter of the Year || 
|-
|rowspan="2"| 2001 ||| "To Her Door" || Best Australian songs || 
|-
|"Treaty" || Best Australian songs || 
|-
| 2004 || "I Wish I was a Train" || Most Performed Country Work || 
|-
| 2011 || Paul Kelly ||Ted Albert Award for Outstanding Services to Australian Music || 
|-
| 2013 || Conversations with Ghosts || Work of the Year – Vocal or Choral || 
|-
| 2016
| "Freedom Ride" (with Troy Cassar Daley)
| Song of the Year
| 
|-
| 2018 || "Firewood and Candles" || Song of the Year || 
|-
| rowspan="2"|2019 || "With the One I Love" || Song of the Year || 
|-
|"Every Day My Mother's Voice" for The Final Quarter || Best Original Song Composed for the Screen || 
|-
| 2020
| "Every Day My Mother's Voice" (with Dan Sultan)
| Song of the Year
| 
|-
| 2021
| "When We're Both Old and Mad" (Paul Kelly & Kasey Chambers)
| Song of the Year
| 
|-

APRA-AGSC Screen Music Awards
These awards are presented annually by APRA in conjunction with Australian Guild of Screen Composers (AGSC) for television and films scores and soundtracks. Paul Kelly has won one award from four nominations.

|-
|rowspan="3"| 2002 ||rowspan="2"| Lantana || Best Feature Film Score || 
|-
| Best Soundtrack Album || 
|-
| One Night the Moon || Best Soundtrack Album || 
|-
| 2007 || Jindabyne || Best Soundtrack Album ||

Countdown Australian Music Awards
Countdown was an Australian pop music TV series on national broadcaster ABC-TV from 1974 to 1987, it presented music awards from 1979 to 1987, initially in conjunction with magazine TV Week. The TV Week / Countdown Awards were a combination of popular-voted and peer-voted awards.

|-
| rowspan="4" |1986
| Gossip
| Best Album
| 
|-
| rowspan="2" | "Before Too Long"
| Best Male Performance in a Video
| 
|-
| Best Single 
| 
|-
| himself
| Best Songwriter
| 
|-

Country Music Association of Australia (CMAA) Awards
These annual awards have been presented by CMAA since 1973, to "encourage, promote and recognise excellence in Australian country music recording." Paul Kelly has won six Country Music Awards from twelve nominations.

|-
| 1994 || "From Little Things Big Things Grow" || Heritage Award || 
|-
| 1999 || "Until Death Do Them Part" || Song of the Year || 
|-
| 2003 || "Wish I Was a Train" || Vocal Collaboration of the Year || 
|-
|rowspan="8"| 2006 ||| "You're Learning" || Vocal Collaboration of the Year || 
|-
| "Lonesome but Free" || APRA Song of the Year || 
|-
| rowspan ="3"|"Song of the Old Rake"|| APRA Song of the Year || 
|-
| Male Vocalist of the Year || 
|-
| Video Clip of the Year || 
|-
| rowspan="2"| Foggy Highway || Album of the Year || 
|-
| Top Selling Album of the Year || 
|-
| "Rally Around the Drum" || Heritage Song of the Year || 
|-
| 2009 || "Still Here"|| Vocal Collaboration of the Year || 
|-
| 2018
| "Hey" (with Kasey Chambers)
| Vocal Collaboration of the Year
| 
|-

Environmental Music Prize
The Environmental Music Prize is a quest to find a theme song to inspire action on climate and conservation. It commenced in 2022.

! 
|-
| 2022
| "Sleep Australia Sleep"
| Environmental Music Prize
| 
| 
|-

Australian Entertainment Awards (Mo Awards)
The Mo Awards are the annual Australian entertainment industry awards, and recognise achievements by performers in live entertainment in Australia since 1975. The award categories are reviewed and in 2008 were: Musical Theatre, Opera, Classical, Comedy, Country and Variety. In 1989 and 1990, they included a Rock category, Paul Kelly won four Mo Awards, twice as Male Rock Performer and twice as leader of Paul Kelly and the Messengers to win the Rock Group award.

|-
|rowspan="2"| 1989 ||| Paul Kelly || Male Rock Performer || 
|-
| Paul Kelly and the Messengers || Rock Group || 
|-
|rowspan="2"| 1990 ||| Paul Kelly || Male Rock Performer || 
|-
| Paul Kelly and the Messengers || Rock Group ||

Helpmann Awards 
The Helpmann Awards recognise achievements in live performance in Australia. In 2015, Kelly received the JC Williamson Award, the LPA's highest honour, for their life's work in live performance

|-
|| 2009 ||| More Songs from the South || Best Australian Contemporary Concert || 
|-
|| 2013 ||| Neil Finn & Paul Kelly || Best Australian Contemporary Concert || 
|-
|| 2015 ||| Himself || JC Williamson Award || 
|-
|| 2017 ||| Ancient Rain (with Camille O'Sullivan and Feargal Murray) || Best Original Score || 
|-
|| 2019 ||| Making Gravy 2018 || Best Australian Contemporary Concert || 
|-

J Awards
The J Awards are an annual series of Australian music awards that were established by the Australian Broadcasting Corporation's youth-focused radio station Triple J. They commenced in 2005.

! 
|-
| J Awards of 2021
| "Little Things" (with Ziggy Ramo) (directed by Ziggy Ramo)
| Australian Video of the Year
| 
|

Music Victoria Awards
The Music Victoria Awards, are an annual awards night celebrating Victorian music. The commenced in 2005. (awards 2005-2012 are unknown).

|-
| 2010
| himself
| Hall of Fame
| 
|-
| rowspan="2"| 2013
| Spring and Fall
| Best Album
| 
|-
| himself
| Best Male Act
| 
|-
| 2015
| The Merri Soul Sessions
| Best Soul, Funk, R'n'B and Gospel Album
| 
|-
| 2017
| himself
| Best Male Act
| 
|-
| 2019
| himself
| Best Male Musician
| 
|-

Order of Australia 

The Order of Australia was established on 14 February 1975 to honour Australian citizens and other persons for achievement or meritorious service.

|-
| 2017 || Paul Maurice Kelly
 || Officer of the Order of Australia || 
|-

Victorian Country Music Awards
These annual awards are presented by the Victorian Country Music Association. Paul Kelly won three awards for the 2000 album Smoke or one of its tracks "Until Death Do Them Part", all recorded by Paul Kelly with Uncle Bill.

|-
|rowspan="3"| 2000 || rowspan="2"| "Until Death Do Them Part" || Victorian Group || 
|-
| Open Group || 
|-
|Smoke || Victorian Album of the Year ||

Other recognition
In August 2022, the City of Adelaide renamed a laneway in the city centre off Flinders Street Paul Kelly Lane. Previously named Pilgrim Lane after the adjacent Pilgrim Uniting Church, the lane is now called Paul Kelly Lane. It is the fourth such renaming after musicians associated with the city, the others being Sia Furler, No Fixed Address, and Cold Chisel.

See also

Paul Kelly discography – includes sales certifications

Notes

References

Kelly, Paul
Awards